Glen Allen, Glen Allan or Glenallen may refer to:

Places
 Glen Allen, Alabama, U.S.
 Glen Allan, Mississippi, U.S.
 Glen Allen, Missouri, U.S.
 Glen Allen, Virginia, U.S.
 Glen Allen High School
 Glennallen, Alaska, U.S.
 Glen Allan, Ontario, Canada; see Conestogo Lake

People with the surname
 Glenn Allen Jr. (born 1970), U.S. autoracer
 Glenallen Hill (born 1965), U.S. professional baseball player

See also
 Glen Ellen, California, U.S.
 Glen Ellyn, Illinois, U.S.